Gladys Gertrude Crockett (born December 1, 1895) was an American Republican politician from Upton, Massachusetts. She represented the 9th Worcester district in the Massachusetts House of Representatives from 1953 to 1954.

References

1895 births
Year of death missing
Members of the Massachusetts House of Representatives
Women state legislators in Massachusetts
20th-century American politicians
20th-century American women politicians
People from Upton, Massachusetts